Eriophyllum ambiguum is a species of flowering plant in the family Asteraceae known by the common name beautiful woolly sunflower. It is native to the deserts and adjacent hills of southern and eastern California, northwestern Arizona, and southern Nevada.

Eriophyllum ambiguum grows in chaparral, woodlands, and desert habitat. It is an annual herb growing decumbent or upright with stems up to 30 centimeters (1 foot) long. The leaves are widely lance-shaped or oblong and sometimes have lobes, with woolly hairs on both sides. The inflorescence produces one flower head containing many yellow disc florets and 6 to 10 yellow, white, or bicolored ray florets which are each 2 millimeters to one centimeter (0.08-0.40 inches) long. The fruit is a rough-haired achene which may have a very small pappus.

Varieties
Eriophyllum ambiguum var. ambiguum - California, mostly in Kern County
Eriophyllum ambiguum var. paleaceum (Brandegee) Ferris - California, Nevada, Arizona

References

External links
 [Calflora: Eriophyllum ambiguum]
Jepson Manual Treatment
United States Department of Agriculture Plants Profile
Calphotos Photo gallery, University of California

ambiguum
Flora of the Southwestern United States
Flora of the California desert regions
Natural history of the Mojave Desert
Plants described in 1865
Taxa named by Asa Gray
Flora without expected TNC conservation status